Love and Fear may refer to:

 Love and Fear (film), a 1988 film directed by Margarethe von Trotta
 Love and Fear (album), a 1999 album by Jimmy Barnes
 Love + Fear, a 2019 album by Marina
 Love + Fear (Acoustic), a 2019 EP by Marina featuring acoustic versions of songs from the previous album
 Love and Fear, a 2012 album by We Shot the Moon
 "Love and Fear", a 2017 song by Imelda May on the deluxe edition of Life Love Flesh Blood

See also 
 Fear and Love, a 2008 album by We Shot the Moon